Caldecote is a village and civil parish in Cambridgeshire, in the district of South Cambridgeshire, England. It lies south of the A428, approximately six miles west of Cambridge and three miles east of Cambourne.

Nearby settlements are Hardwick and Toft to the east, Bourn to the west, Childerley to the north and Kingston to the south. Bourn Airfield lies on the north-west edge of the village.

History
The older part of the village lies to the south, just off the B1046 road and is mentioned in the Domesday Book of 1086. The parish church, St. Michael and All Angels, parts of which date to the 14th century, is in this part of the village. Bourn Brook and the route of the former Oxford and Cambridge Railway run to the south of the village.

Highfields Caldecote
Highfields Caldecote is a newer development in the north of the village. The A428 was converted to a dual carriageway and was opened in 2007, allowing easier access.

The development in Highfields led to a rapid increase in the population of Caldecote from an estimated 800 in 2001 to 1,737 in 2011. It now proudly boasts a  hairdressers, named Caldecutz, and a Social Club.

Economy
The village was home to the headquarters of the Raspberry Pi Foundation, a charity known worldwide for developing the Raspberry Pi computer system.

References

External links

 Caldecote Local History Group
 Caldecote Parish Website
 St Michael and All Angels Website
 Caldecote Scout Group

Villages in Cambridgeshire
Civil parishes in Cambridgeshire
South Cambridgeshire District